A Cat in the Brain, also known as Nightmare Concert, is a 1990 Italian horror film written and directed by Lucio Fulci. Fulci stars as a fictionalized version of himself, a tortured horror filmmaker who is driven by the violent visions that he experiences both behind the camera and off the set. Feeling like he's losing his grip on reality and disturbed by murderous fantasies, Fulci consults a psychotherapist, who is secretly a serial killer and using hypnosis, exploiting the director's vulnerabilities to his own murderous ends. 

A Cat in the Brain has been called the horror film equivalent of Federico Fellini's 8½, using cynical, Grand Guignol humour. Juxtaposing gory horror clips from several of his own past horror films which he had worked on, Fulci shot a wrap-around segment featuring his own plot and used Vincenzo Tomassi's film editing to create the storyline – a personal insight into the effects of horror filmmaking on the psyche.

Plot 
Lucio Fulci (playing himself) is a former medical doctor-turned director of gory horror films. He wraps up shooting for the day on his latest film, Touch of Death. Fulci leaves the Cinecittà Studios for a local restaurant down the street. The waiter recognizes him and suggests his typical meal. Fulci cannot look at the sample plates of meat without having flashbacks to the cannibalistic scene he'd been filming earlier. Shaken, he leaves the restaurant without ordering. Later, while checking special effects from another movie, Fulci irritably snaps at a technician to get a plate of animal eyeballs out of his sight.

Returning home to his row house in an old suburb of Rome, the troubled director tries to sleep, but the noise of a handyman's chainsaw outside keeps him awake with recollections of his own recently shot chainsaw mayhem. In a rage, Fulci storms outside and smashes a hatchet into cans of paint belonging to the handyman. Fulci goes to see a psychiatrist, professor Egon Schwarz who accepts Fulci into his books for a session. Schwarz discusses Fulci's recent problems and suggests that he's "breaking down the barrier, the boundary between what you film and what's real."

Fulci is revealed to be making two films simultaneously: The Touch of Death and Ghosts of Sodom. After Fulci leaves the set, his producer steers him into a studio suite for an interview with a Munich news crew. The sight of the tall, blond, German lady reporter's long legs triggers a vision of sexual abandon in Nazi Germany (from the film Ghosts of Sodom). When Fulci recovers from his vision, Filippo then informs the confused director that he has just run amok, smashed the TV crew's camera, and tried to rip the interviewer's clothes off.

Professor Schwarz calls Fulci for another consultation after he had watched all of his films. He suggests using hypnosis. Once Fulci is under, the Professor's true colors are revealed. He switches on a buzzer device and describes a mad scheme: "You'll do everything I tell you when you hear this sound. You will slowly be possessed by madness. You'll think you've committed terrible crimes." After the session is over, Fulci leaves, unable to remember anything. Schwarz then embarks on a killing spree, starting with the murder of a local prostitute that evening. Fulci arrives on the scene and thinks he committed the murder.

Back home the following morning, Fulci is plagued with visions of violence from his movies. He goes for a drive, but Schwarz follows him and commits more murders, again Fulci thinks he committed them. Fulci hallucinates running over a tramp (from the movie Touch of Death). After returning home, he phones the police station to speak to his friend Inspector Gabrielli, intending to make a "confession." But learns that Gabrielli is on vacation.

After another visit to Professor Schwarz is of little help, Fulci decides to drive over to Inspector Gabrielli's house in the hope of speaking to him. Schwarz follows him there with the buzzer device. Fulci lets himself into the house, and immediately suffers from visions of Gabrielle's family being murdered. Fulci staggers outside to be greeted by the returning Gabrielle, when Fulci expresses his visions to him he reassures the director that his family are safely on holiday in Sardinia.

Meanwhile, Professor Schwarz murders his wife with piano wire. Schwarz then follows Fulci, who, again under the influence of hypnosis, has more visions of violent imagery and faints in the middle of a field. He comes round the next morning to discover a cat digging up the loosely buried remains of another Swharz victim. As Fulci scrapes soil from the dead features, Inspector Gabrielli appears behind him. Before Fulci can protest his innocence, Gabrielli informs him that Schwarz has been shot dead by his men who were tailing Fulci which he ordered after their conversation the previous day, who caught the mad psychiatrist in the act.

Several months later, Fulci and Nurse Lilly sail on his sailboat, Perversion (named after his movie). Fulci follows the young nurse into the cabin-quarters. Suddenly, the sound of a chainsaw revs up, followed by her screams. Fulci emerges from the cabin with a basket of her body parts and attaches them onto fishing hooks. Just when it appears that Fulci is a crazed killer after all, it is revealed that it’s the end of his latest movie, Nightmare Concert, captured by a film crew in another boat sailing alongside. Bidding goodbye to his colleagues, Fulci happily sails out of the harbor with his very-much-alive leading lady. 

(An alternate ending added by the Italian distributor to the Italian language print ends with a bloodcurdling scream from below deck dubbed onto the soundtrack after Fulci and the girl sail away from the dock, hinting that Fulci was a maniacal killer.)

Cast 
 Lucio Fulci as himself
 Brett Halsey as Human Monster (archive footage from Touch of Death)
 David L. Thompson as Professor Egon Schwarz
 Jeoffrey Kennedy as Officer Gabrielli
 Malisa Longo as Katya Schwarz
 Ria De Simone as Soprano (archive footage from Touch of Death)
 Sacha Maria Darwin as Woman in the oven (archive footage from Touch of Death)
 Robert Egon as himself/Second Human Monster (also archive footage from 'Ghosts of Sodom')
 Shillet Angel as Filippo, the producer
 Lubka Lenzi (stock footage from Massacre (1989))
 Paul Muller (stock footage from Hansel and Gretel (1989))
 Maurice Poli (stock footage from The Murder Secret (1988))
 Vincenzo Luzzi as Chainsaw man
 Marco Di Stefano (stock footage from Bloody Psycho (1989))
 Layla Frank 
 Judi Morrow as Nurse Lilly

Production 

The film was composed almost entirely in post-production, assembled from clips of two of Lucio Fulci's past horror films, "Sodoma's Ghost" (1988) and "Touch of Death" (1988), as well as from a few horror films made by other directors which were supervised by Fulci: Leandro Lucchetti's "Bloody Psycho" (1989), Giovanni Simonelli's "Hansel e Gretel" (1990), Andrea Bianchi's "Massacre" (1989) and Mario Bianchi's "The Murder Secret" (1988). The wrap-around segments were largely shot in and around Rome's famous Cinecittà Studios and on Fulci's private yacht, "Perversion".

Release 

The original film was first released in Italy on 8 August 1990.

Home media 
The theatrical version of the film was released in the US and Japan on LaserDisc in the late 1990s. The uncut, uncensored director's cut of the film was released in North America for the first time on VHS and DVD by Image Entertainment in 2001 (in very limited quantities) as a part of "The Euroshock Collection", then reissued on 31 March 2009 by Grindhouse Releasing on the Ryko/Warner Brothers label.

In 2016, Grindhouse Releasing released the uncensored director's cut of the film on Blu-ray.

References

Sources

External links 

 

Films directed by Lucio Fulci
Films with screenplays by Lucio Fulci
Films about film directors and producers
Films about filmmaking
Self-reflexive films
Italian horror films
Films about cats
1990s Italian-language films
Italian slasher films
Films set in Rome
Films set in the 1980s
Metafictional works
Italian splatter films
Films about animals
Films scored by Fabio Frizzi
1990 films
1990 horror films
1990s slasher films